The 2015 Southern Utah Thunderbirds football team represented Southern Utah University in the 2015 NCAA Division I FCS football season. They were led by eighth-year head coach Ed Lamb and played their home games at Eccles Coliseum. This was their fourth year as a member of the Big Sky Conference. They finished the season 8–4, 7–1 in Big Sky play to be crowned Big Sky champion for the first time. They received the Big Sky's automatic bid to the FCS playoffs where they lost in the first round to Sam Houston State.

On December 26, Lamb resigned to become the special teams coordinator and tight ends coach at BYU. He finished at Southern Utah with an eight year record of 45–47.

Schedule

 Source: Schedule

Game summaries

at Utah State

at South Dakota State

Northern Colorado

Brevard

at Weber State

Sacramento State

at UC Davis

Cal Poly

at Montana State

at Portland State

Northern Arizona

FCS Playoffs

First Round–at Sam Houston State

Ranking movements

References

Southern Utah
Southern Utah Thunderbirds football seasons
Big Sky Conference football champion seasons
Southern Utah
Southern Utah Thunderbirds football